The 1923 College Football All-America team is composed of college football players who were selected as All-Americans by various organizations and writers that chose College Football All-America Teams in 1923. The only two selectors recognized by the NCAA as "official" for the 1923 season are Walter Camp, whose selections were published in Collier's Weekly, and Football World magazine.   Additional selectors who chose All-American teams in 1923 include Athletic World magazine, selected by 500 coaches, Norman E. Brown, sports editor of the Central Press Association, and Davis J. Walsh, sports editor for the International News Service.

The consensus All-Americans recognized by the NCAA include: halfback Red Grange of Illinois, known as "The Galloping Ghost" and who in 2008 was named by ESPN as the best college football player of all time; halfback Harry Wilson of Penn State, who was later inducted into the National Lacrosse Hall of Fame; quarterback George Pfann of Cornell, who later became a Rhodes scholar; end Lynn Bomar of Vanderbilt, who became one of the first Southern players to be recognized as a consensus All-American; tackle Marty Below of Wisconsin, who Red Grange called "the greatest lineman that I ever played against"; and center Jack Blott of Michigan, who later played professional baseball for the Cincinnati Reds.

Consensus All-Americans
For the year 1923, the NCAA recognizes two All-American teams as "official" designations for purposes of its consensus determinations. The following chart identifies the NCAA-recognized consensus All-Americans and displays which first-team designations they received.

All-Americans of 1923

Ends

Lynn Bomar, Vanderbilt (College Football Hall of Fame) (AW-2; WC-1; FW)
Ray Eklund, Minnesota (AW-1; FW; LP-1; NB-1; DW-2; TT-1; PH-1, BE)
Pete MacRae, Syracuse (AW-1; WC-2; FW; LP-1; NB-1; DW-1; TT-1; PH-1, BE)
Homer Hazel, Rutgers (College Football Hall of Fame) (WC-1)
Henry Wakefield, Vanderbilt (NB-2; DW-1, BE)
Richard Luman, Yale (AW-3; WC-3; DW-2, BE)
Bill Supplee, Maryland (LP-2; DW-3; TT-2, BE)
Charles Tallman, West Virginia (AW-3; WC-2, BE)
Charlie Berry, Lafayette (AW-2)
Frank Rokusek, Illinois (LP-2)
Elmer A. Lampe, Chicago (NB-2)
Fred Graham, West Virginia (TT-2)
Edmund Stout, Princeton (WC-3)
Frank L. Henderson, Cornell (DW-3)
Wayne Hall, Washington (TT-3)
Henry Bjorkman, Dartmouth (TT-3)
John W. Hancock, Iowa (BE)
Jim Lawson, Stanford (BE)

Tackles

Century Milstead, Yale (College Football Hall of Fame) (AW-1; WC-1; FW; LP-1; NB-1; DW-1; TT-1; PH-1, BE)
Marty Below, Wisconsin (College Football Hall of Fame) (AW-1; FW; LP-2; NB-1; DW-1; TT-2, BE)
Frank Sundstrom, Cornell (AW-2; WC-1; LP-1; NB-2; DW-3; TT-3; PH-1, BE)
Stanley Muirhead, Michigan (AW-2; LP-2; NB-2, BE)
Chet Widerquist, Washington & Jefferson (WC-2; TT-2, BE [as g])
Pappy Waldorf, Syracuse (College Football Hall of Fame) (AW-3; DW-2)
Stewart "Stew" Beam, California (WC-3; DW-2, BE)
Henry Bassett, Nebraska (AW-3; WC-3, BE)
Art Delbel, Lafayette (WC-2)
Edwin F. Blair, Yale (DW-3)
Joe Bach, Notre Dame (TT-1)
Norman Anderson, USC (TT-3)
Joe Bennett, Georgia (BE)
Robbie Robinson, Florida (BE)

Guards

Charles Hubbard, Harvard (AW-1; WC-1; FW; LP-1; NB-1; DW-1; TT-2; PH-1, BE)
Jim McMillen, Illinois (AW-1; FW; NB-1; DW-1; TT-1, BE)
Joe Bedenk, Penn State (AW-2; WC-1; DW-2; TT-3; PH-1, BE)
Edliff Slaughter, Michigan (LP-1)
James Welsh, Colgate (AW-2; LP-2; NB-2; DW-2; TT-1)
August Farwick, Army (AW-3; NB-2; DW-3; TT-2)
Cyril Aschenback, Dartmouth (AW-3; WC-2; LP-2; TT-3)
Harvey Brown, Notre Dame (WC-2)
Arthur G. Carney, Navy (WC-3)
William Johnson, Texas A&M (WC-3)
Richard Faville, Stanford (DW-3, BE)
Goldy Goldstein, Florida (BE)
Tuck Kelly, Vanderbilt (BE)
Adolph Bieberstein, Wisconsin (BE)

Centers

Jack Blott, Michigan (AW-1; WC-1; FW; NB-1; DW-1, BE)
Edgar Garbisch, Army (College Football Hall of Fame) (AW-2; WC-3; NB-2; DW-2; TT-1; PH-1, BE)
Edwin C. Horrell, California (College Football Hall of Fame) (AW-3; LP-1; DW-3, BE)
Winslow Lovejoy, Yale (WC-2; LP-2; TT-2, BE)
Adam Walsh, Notre Dame (TT-3)
Clyde Propst, Alabama (BE)
Claire Frye, Georgia Tech (BE)
Ralph Claypool, Purdue (BE)
Dolph Eckstein, Brown (BE)

Quarterbacks

George Pfann, Cornell (AW-1; WC-1; FW; LP-1; NB-1; DW-1; TT-1; PH-1, BE)
Lyle Richeson, Yale (WC-2; DW-2; TT-2, BE)
Hoge Workman, Ohio State (AW-2; NB-2, BE)
Irwin Uteritz, Michigan (LP-2; DW-3, BE)
Harry Stuhldreher, Notre Dame (College Football Hall of Fame) (AW-3; TT-3, BE)
Red Dunn, Marquette (WC-3)
Herb Covington, Centre (BE)
Harold Chapman, Oregon (BE)
Charles Darling, Boston College (BE)

Halfbacks

Red Grange, Illinois (College Football Hall of Fame) (AW-1; WC-1; FW; LP-1; NB-1; DW-1; TT-1; PH-1, BE)
Harry Wilson, Penn State (College Football Hall of Fame) (AW-1; WC-2; FW; DW-2; TT-2; PH-1, BE)
Don Miller, Notre Dame (College Football Hall of Fame) (LP-2; NB-1; DW-1; TT-2 [fb], BE)
Earl Martineau, Minnesota (AW-3; WC-1; NB-2; TT-3 [fb], BE)
Harry Kipke, Michigan (College Football Hall of Fame) (AW-2; LP-1; TT-3)
Don Nichols, California (AW-2; TT-1; BE)
Mal Stevens, Yale (College Football Hall of Fame) (WC-2 [fb]; LP-2; DW-3; TT-3)
Dave Noble, Nebraska (LP-2; DW-2; TT-2)
Eddie Tryon, Colgate (AW-3; WC-2; BE)
Walter Koppisch, Columbia (College Football Hall of Fame) (WC-3)
Karl Bohren, Pittsburgh (WC-3)
Gil Reese, Vanderbilt (DW-3, BE)

Fullbacks

Bill Mallory, Yale (College Football Hall of Fame) (AW-2; WC-1; NB-1; DW-1; TT-1; PH-1, BE)
John Levi, Haskell (AW-1; FW, BE)
Elmer Layden, Notre Dame (College Football Hall of Fame) (LP-1; DW-2, BE)
Merrill Taft, Wisconsin (LP-2; NB-2, BE)
Ernie Nevers, Stanford (College and Pro Football Hall of Fame) (AW-3; WC-3, BE)
John Webster Thomas, Chicago (DW-3)
Doug Wycoff, Georgia Tech (BE)
Gus Eckberg, West Virginia (BE)
Charles E. Cassidy, Cornell (BE)

Key
NCAA recognized selectors for 1923
 WC = Collier's Weekly as selected by Walter Camp
 FW = Football World magazine

Other selectors
 AW = Athletic World magazine, selected by 500 coaches
 NB = Norman E. Brown, sports editor of the Central Press Association
 LP = Lawrence Perry
 DW = Davis J. Walsh, sports editor for the International News Service
 TT = Tom Thorp, for the Baltimore News
 PH = Percy Haughton, Cornell coach
 BE = Billy Evans's "National Honor Roll"

Bold = Consensus All-American
 -1 – First-team selection
 -2 – Second-team selection
 -3 – Third-team selection

See also
 1923 All-Big Ten Conference football team
 1923 All-Pacific Coast football team
 1923 All-Southern college football team
 1923 All-Western college football team

References

All-America Team
College Football All-America Teams